Moacir Da Rosa Wilmsen (born 13 March 1993), commonly known as Moacir, is a Brazilian footballer.

Career statistics

Club

Notes

References

1993 births
Living people
Brazilian footballers
Brazilian expatriate footballers
Association football midfielders
Sociedade Esportiva e Recreativa Caxias do Sul players
Caxias Futebol Clube players
Grêmio Esportivo Juventus players
Clube Esportivo Aimoré players
Pembroke Athleta F.C. players
Angthong F.C. players
Brazilian expatriate sportspeople in Malta
Expatriate footballers in Malta
Brazilian expatriate sportspeople in Thailand
Expatriate footballers in Thailand